

1903

Non-circulating coins

1904

Non-circulating coins

1905

Non-circulating coins

References 

Commemorative coins of the United States